Joseph Aloysius Ward (September 2, 1884 –  August 11, 1934) was a Major League Baseball player who played second base for the Philadelphia Phillies in the  season. He also played for the Phillies in 1909–1910 seasons and also part of 1909 with the New York Highlanders. In 166 games, Ward had 110 hits in 465 at-bats, for a .237 batting average. He batted and threw right-handed. He was born and died in Philadelphia, Pennsylvania.

External links

Major League Baseball infielders
New York Yankees players
Philadelphia Phillies players
Baseball players from Philadelphia
Minor league baseball managers
Altoona Mountaineers players
Lancaster Red Roses players
Rochester Bronchos players
Rochester Hustlers players
Memphis Chickasaws players
Elmira Colonels players
Omaha Rourkes players
St. Joseph Drummers players
Gettysburg Ponies players
Rockford Rox players
Raleigh Nats players
1884 births
1934 deaths
Shamokin (minor league baseball) players